Spellevator is an educational computer game for the Apple II published by MECC in 1988.

Gameplay

The player controls a dust bunny, which is chased by several vacuum cleaners with different movement patterns. The objective of the level is to grab all the letters and exit through the upper left corner. The player can pass through an unoccupied elevator (some vacuum cleaners use elevators also) by correctly answering a spelling or vocabulary question. Once one completes a level, the player can receive a bonus by correctly unscrambling the letters one grabbed into a word).

Spellevator has a utility on the disk's flipside that let a user create a word list and save it to any ProDOS formatted floppy disk. This way, teachers could customize the game to fit their own particular vocabulary lists.

Legacy
Spellevator was followed by Spellevator Plus for additional platforms.

References

External links
Educational game article at 1up.com

1988 video games
Children's educational video games
Apple II games
Apple II-only games
Video games developed in the United States
The Learning Company games
Multiplayer and single-player video games